Hong Kong Correctional Services (also called Correctional Services department (CSD)) is responsible for the management of prisoners and prisons in Hong Kong. The Commissioner of Correctional Services reports to the Secretary for Security.

Although the Chief Magistrate (now Commissioner of Police) was given control over prisons in 1841, the legislation to create the department did not come into being until 1853. CSD was part of the Hong Kong Police Force until 1879 when the role of Superintendent of Victoria Gaol was created.  The department has been financially independent from the Hong Kong Police Force since December 1920, when the Superintendent of Victoria Gaol was re-titled as the Superintendent of Prisons.

History 
In February 2021, it was reported that the CSD had worked with the Security Bureau to reduce "collusion" between foreign governments and those in custody. The CSD began to ask those in custody to produce both their HKID and foreign passports, or else consulate staff would not be allowed to assist them. In addition, for those in custody who may have broken the national security law, they would be required to sign an oath to declare their nationalities. The Canadian government revealed that a prisoner with a Canadian passport was forced to choose a nationality on 18 January 2021. A spokesperson for the United States said that there were now "deep concerns that this new Hong Kong policy will compel people to declare their citizenship under duress and without an opportunity to understand the full implications of the declaration." In response, the CSD declined to comment.

Also in February 2021, commissioner Woo Ying Ming claimed that some people were becoming prisoners for the glorification of being imprisoned for political reasons, and also said that district councillors would be restricted from visiting prisoners unless they give a "valid reason."

In March 2021, Apple Daily reported that sources told the newspaper that the CSD's "secret unit" handled the detention of Andy Li, who was arrested for attempting to flee to Taiwan.

Ranks
As with all of the Hong Kong Disciplined Services, British-pattern rank insignia continue to be utilised, with the only change being the replacement of the St. Edward's Crown by the Bauhinia flower crest in 1997.

Commissioner of Correctional Services (similar insignia to a UK General)
Deputy Commissioner (similar insignia to a UK Lieutenant-General)
Assistant Commissioner (similar insignia to a UK Major-General)
Chief Superintendent (similar insignia to a UK Colonel)
General manager. (Correctional Services Industries)
Senior Superintendent (similar insignia to a UK Lieutenant-Colonel)
Superintendent (similar insignia to a UK Major)
Chief Officer (similar insignia to a UK Captain)
Principal Officer (similar insignia to a UK Lieutenant with a bar beneath)
Officer (similar insignia to a UK Lieutenant)
Probationary Officer (similar insignia to a UK Second Lieutenant)
Technical Instructor 
Assistant Officer I (similar insignia to a UK Sergeant)
Assistant Officer II (similar to a UK Private)
Instructor

Equipment

Corrections guards presently wear green uniforms. The prison vehicles are blue and yellow and have the logo on them.

Firearms 
 Smith & Wesson M10 Heavy Barrel Revolver
 Remington 870 Shotgun
 SIG Sauer MPX SBR Semi-automatic carbine
 Ruger Mini-14 Semi-automatic rifle
 Colt AR-15 Semi-automatic rifle
 Colt LE6940 Semi-automatic rifle
 Type 56 Semi Automatic Rifle（Ceremonial Purposes）
 UTAS UTS-15 Shotgun
 Pepperball VKS Less-lethal
 Tippmann 98 custom Less-lethal
 Pepperball TCP Less-lethal
 Federal Riot Gun
 Penn Arms GL-1 Grenade launcher
 Def-Tec 37mm Grenade launcher

Vehicles

Ships

Facilities

CSD runs 28 facilities across Hong Kong ranging from maximum security prisons to rehabilitation centres.

Prisoner demographics
 there was a daily average of 8,310 prisoners in the Hong Kong prison system. The prisons had an occupancy rate of 81.6 per cent, while training, detention, rehabilitation, and drug addiction treatment centres had an occupancy rate of 30.8 per cent.

Reading materials
 there were about 100,000 books in the prison libraries; the percentages by language were 83% Chinese, 10% English, and 7% not in Chinese nor English. Prison authorities stated that they did not wish to buy very many books in neither official language to ensure the security of the prisons; Legco member Shiu Ka-chun criticised this rationale.

Crest

The current crest of the force was adopted in 1997 to replace most of the colonial symbols:

 St Edward's Crown replaced by the stylised Bauhinia flower crest
 Replacement of the Royal cypher by a Compass rose, with the words "Correctional Services 懲教署" circling it
 Addition of a laurel wreath bearing the words "Correctional Services Hong Kong"

Staff associations
 Hong Kong Correctional Services General Union
 Correctional Services Officers' Association
 Hong Kong Correctional Services Department Assistant Officers General Association
 Hong Kong Chinese Civil Servants' Association Correctional Services Department Branch
 The Association for the Retired Staff of the Hong Kong Correctional Services Department

CSD in popular media
TVB drama series Tomorrow Is Another Day was filmed with the full co-operation of the CSD who allowed the film crew to film and access to Stanley and other prisons.
2017 Independent Movie  (同囚) was filmed as a story about prisoners being tortured inhumanly in Sha Tsui Correctional Institution. A claim that the film was based on real events was later retracted.

References

External links

Correctional Services Department
 
 Index of articles at the South China Morning Post

Correctional Services
Correctional Services
Prison and correctional agencies
Prisons in Hong Kong
Provincial-level prison administrative bureaux in China